Bagan is the name of several rural localities in Novosibirsk Oblast, Russia:
Bagan, Bagansky District, Novosibirsk Oblast, a selo in Bagansky District
Bagan, Dovolensky District, Novosibirsk Oblast, a settlement in Dovolensky District